Geneviève Bélanger (born 24 December 1987) is a Canadian retired competitor in synchronized swimming.

She won a bronze medal at the 2011 World Aquatics Championships.

References
 FINA profile

Living people
Canadian synchronized swimmers
1987 births
World Aquatics Championships medalists in synchronised swimming
Sportspeople from Laval, Quebec
Synchronized swimmers at the 2011 World Aquatics Championships
20th-century Canadian women
21st-century Canadian women